Deer Creek Township is one of fourteen townships in Carroll County, Indiana. As of the 2010 census, its population was 4,571 and it contained 1,970 housing units.

History
Deer Creek Township was organized in 1828.

The Baum-Shaeffer Farm, Carrollton Bridge, Deer Creek Valley Rural Historic District, Delphi Lime Kilns, Lock No. 33 Lock Keeper's House, and Wabash and Erie Canal Lock No. 33, Fred and Minnie Raber Farm, Sunset Point, and Wilson Bridge are listed on the National Register of Historic Places.

Geography

Cities and towns
 Delphi (the county seat)

Unincorporated towns
 Harley (extinct)

Adjacent townships
 Adams (north)
 Rock Creek (northeast)
 Jackson (east)
 Monroe (southeast)
 Madison (south)
 Washington Township, Tippecanoe County (southwest)
 Tippecanoe (west)
 Tippecanoe Township, Tippecanoe County (west)

Major highways
  U.S. Route 421
  Indiana State Road 18
  Indiana State Road 25
  Indiana State Road 218

Cemeteries
The township contains eight cemeteries: Bostetter, Delphi, Mears, Robinson, Saint Josephs, Sharp Point, Whistler and Wingard.

References
 
 United States Census Bureau cartographic boundary files

External links

 Indiana Township Association
 United Township Association of Indiana

Townships in Carroll County, Indiana
Lafayette metropolitan area, Indiana
Townships in Indiana